is a dam across Iwase river in Kobayashi, Miyazaki Prefecture, Japan, completed in 1967.

References 

Dams in Miyazaki Prefecture
Dams completed in 1967